The 2016–17 South Florida Bulls women's basketball team represented the University of South Florida in the 2016–17 NCAA Division I basketball season. The Bulls, coached by Jose Fernandez in his seventeenth season, played their home games at the USF Sun Dome in Tampa, Florida. This was USF's fourth season as a member of the American Athletic Conference, known as The American or AAC. They finished the season 24–9, 11–5 in AAC play to finish in third place. They advanced to the championship game of the American Athletic Conference women's tournament for the third year in a row, where they lost to Connecticut for the third time. They received at-large bid to the NCAA women's tournament where they lost to Missouri in the first round.

Media
All Bulls games will air on Bullscast Radio or CBS 1010 AM. Conference home games will rotate between ESPN3, AAC Digital, and Bullscast. Road games will typically be streamed on the opponents website, though conference road games could also appear on ESPN3 or AAC Digital.

Roster

Schedule

|-
!colspan=9 style="background:#006747; color:#CFC493;"| Regular season

|-
!colspan=12 style="background:#006747;"|American Athletic Conference Women's Tournament

|-
!colspan=12 style="background:#006747;"|NCAA Women's Tournament

Rankings

See also
2016–17 South Florida Bulls men's basketball team

References

South Florida Bulls women's basketball seasons
South Florida
South Florida